Paracymoriza taiwanalis is a moth of the family Crambidae described by Alfred Ernest Wileman and Richard South in 1917. It is found in Taiwan.

References

Moths described in 1917
Acentropinae
Taxa named by Richard South